Washington's 9th legislative district is one of forty-nine districts in Washington state for representation in the state legislature. The sprawling rural district includes all of Adams, Asotin, Franklin, Garfield, and Whitman counties as well as parts of Spokane County. The district resides in the extreme southeast of the state, bordering Oregon to the south and Idaho to the east.

The mostly rural district is represented by state senator Mark Schoesler and state representatives Mary Dye (position 1) and Joe Schmick (position 2), all Republicans.

List of Washington House of Representatives

Position 1

Position 2

See also
Washington Redistricting Commission
Washington State Legislature
Washington State Senate
Washington House of Representatives

References

External links
Washington State Redistricting Commission
Washington House of Representatives
Map of Legislative Districts

09